Klyashevo may refer to the following rural localities in Russia:
 Klyashevo, Chishminsky District, Republic of Bashkortostan
 Klyashevo, Iglinsky District, Republic of Bashkortostan